Christopher Klute (born March 5, 1990) is an American soccer player currently without a club. He most recently played for the California United Strikers FC in the National Independent Soccer Association.

Club

Atlanta Silverbacks
Klute played one season with both Furman University and Clayton State and spent time with the U.S. U-17s before moving to the Atlanta Silverbacks Reserves in 2011. Interim coach Alex Pineda Chacón called him up to the Silverbacks first team in June 2012.

Colorado Rapids
New head coach Brian Haynes loaned him to Colorado Rapids for the 2013 Major League Soccer season. Colorado purchased him outright in July 2013.

Columbus Crew SC
In January 2015 Klute was traded by Colorado to Columbus Crew SC.

Portland Timbers
Klute was traded by Columbus to Portland Timbers in exchange for allocation money on December 11, 2015.

Minnesota United
Klute was loaned to Minnesota United FC on September 7, 2016.

California United FC II
Klute joined California United in February 2017 and was a key member of the team which captured both the 2017 Spring & Fall Season United Premier Soccer League National Championships.

California United Strikers FC
In August 2019, Klute was signed to the Strikers professional side, California United Strikers FC, in the National Independent Soccer Association ahead of its first season. He appeared in all seven of the team's fall regular season games and in the West Coast Championship in November, which the team won over Los Angeles Force in a penalty kick shootout.

International
He was called up to the United States national team for a January 2014 camp, although he never made an appearance.

References

External links
 
 
 Chris Klute at Clayton State
 Chris Klute at SoccerStats
 Chris Klute at Soccerway

1990 births
Living people
American soccer players
Furman Paladins men's soccer players
Atlanta Silverbacks players
California United Strikers FC players
Colorado Rapids players
Columbus Crew players
Portland Timbers players
Portland Timbers 2 players
North American Soccer League players
Major League Soccer players
USL Championship players
Clayton State Lakers men's soccer players
Soccer players from Texas
United States men's youth international soccer players
United States men's under-20 international soccer players
Association football defenders
People from Grand Prairie, Texas
Sportspeople from the Dallas–Fort Worth metroplex
United Premier Soccer League players
National Premier Soccer League players
National Independent Soccer Association players
Minnesota United FC (2010–2016) players